Creighton Community School (also known as "C.C.S.") is an educational institute in Creighton, Saskatchewan, located at 325 Main Street. There are 579 students and staff attending the school.  C.C.S. includes grades Pre-kindergarten to grade 12.

Athletic teams of the school are called the "Kodiaks."  There are junior and senior sports available. Junior sports are track, volleyball, basketball and badminton. Senior students can play volleyball, basketball, track and golf.

The principal was Jane Dupre as of June 2012.

References

External links 
 Creighton School Division

Elementary schools in Saskatchewan
High schools in Saskatchewan
Educational institutions in Canada with year of establishment missing